Pickings is a 2018 independent dark comedy film written, produced, and directed by Usher Morgan. The film stars Elyse Price, Joel Bernard, Katie Vincent, Joe Trombino, Emil Ferzola, Yaron Urbas and Taso Mikroulis. Price plays Jo Lee-Haywood, a mysterious bar owner defending her family and business from the wrath of a short-tempered mobster and his protection racket. The film was released to theaters in the United States on March 2, 2018.

Cast

 Elyse Price as Jo Lee-Haywood
 Katie Vincent as Scarlet Lee-Haywood
 Joel Bernard as Boone Pickens
 Samantha Zaino as Emma Lee-Haywood
 Joe Trombino as Jimmy Marcone
 Michael Gentile as Momo
 Michael Tyler as Tommy
 Emil Ferzola as Leo DeVitto
 Taso Mikroulis as Marvin Lee-Haywood
 Yaron Urbas as Sam "Hollywood" Barone

Production
Pickings is Usher Morgan's first feature film. Morgan wrote the script and served as the film's director, producer and chief editor. The film was shot for a total of 35 days over the course of a year. The production of the film was announced during a press event at the 2015 Manhattan Film Festival and a pitch trailer was subsequently released on August 7, 2015, in a press release by Digital Magic Entertainment.

Morgan partnered with his Prego cinematographer Louis Obioha, and re-hired Katie Vincent to play the role of Scarlet. As production evolved, Vincent's role in the film became more substantial and she joined the project as a producer. Vincent also wrote and performed many of the film's original songs and served as the film's music supervisor. Morgan also hired Prego actor Taso Mikroulis to play the role of Marvin. The film was fully financed by Morgan, after an Indiegogo campaign failed to reach its desired goal. "I used my own money to fund this film. Took loans, sold assets and maxed out credit cards," Morgan said in an interview with the Huffington Post in 2018.

Principal photography was held in the New York City area under a $350,000 budget; the film was shot in Yonkers, Staten Island, Southampton and New York City for a total of 35 days over the course of a year. Digital Magic Entertainment released the film's Red Band teaser on December 20, 2016, and the Green Band teaser on March 5, 2017. Both trailers are accompanied by an original musical track recorded by Katie Vincent. The film's official trailer was released on December 18, 2017.

Pickings premiered at the AMC Loews in New York City's Lincoln Square on February 22, 2018 and was subsequently released to theaters on March 2, 2018. The distribution was handled by Dark Passage Films and AMC Independent.

Critical response

"Pickings" received generally positive reviews and holds an 80% score on Rotten Tomatoes

Gary Goldstein with the Los Angeles Times gave the film a very positive review, writing "The visually arresting, wickedly entertaining crime drama "Pickings" marks an impressive narrative feature directing debut."

Maitland McDonagh with the Film Journal praised Morgan's directorial style but was critical of the film's handling of its original characters, writing "it's dazzling and all the more impressive because it was executed on an incredibly low budget. What it isn't especially strong on is original characterization. Price's Jo is impressively tough and convincingly wounded, but she's a still a variation on Kill Bill's lethal bride."

Wesley Lara with Hidden Remote Magazina gave the film a favorable review, but criticized some of the characters in the film as "off-the walls crazy" and "a little cheesy". She wrote: "Pickings will definitely not be a film for everyone. This film is incredibly unapologetic in its presentation and homage to previous westerns and noir films and that may turn some people off. It’s not an insult, it’s just a fact of life. However, the sheer creativity and passion behind this project is undeniable, from its gorgeous cinematography and lighting to its energetic acting (along with an accolade-worthy performance from Elyse Price) to its character driven story. Usher Morgan wanted to create a film that was equals parts completely badass and substance with a fun and emotional oddball of a western/noir hybrid."

References

External links
 
 

2018 films
American films about revenge
American black comedy films
American neo-noir films
2010s English-language films
2010s American films